Philip Sharpe (born Leeds 26 January 1968) is a former professional footballer, and was also manager of Bradford P.A. amongst others 

As a player, he started at Doncaster Rovers under Billy Bremner before playing at Halifax Town, Farsley Celtic and abroad at Eendracht Wervik and Union de Centre in Belgium. Sharpe played in the Football League for Halifax.

He returned to play for Gateshead, Ashton Utd, Bradford P.A., Garforth Town and Guiseley. He was appointed Frickley Athletic player-manager in July 2002. With Frickley he won the Sheffield & Hallamshire Senior Cup in season 2003-04.

Sharpe joined A.F.C. Emley as assistant to Paul David in September 2004, after leaving as manager of Frickley Athletic earlier that month. He joined Bradford Park Avenue late in the 2005-06 season when manager Gary Brook was sacked but was himself replaced at by Benny Philips in March 2007. He joined Northwich Victoria in October 2007 as assistant to Neil Redfearn. He left to join Harrogate Railway Athletic as Manager in October 2008.

References

1968 births
Living people
Footballers from Leeds
Doncaster Rovers F.C. players
Halifax Town A.F.C. players
Gateshead F.C. players
Bradford (Park Avenue) A.F.C. managers
Frickley Athletic F.C. managers
Harrogate Town A.F.C. managers
Emley A.F.C. non-playing staff
English football managers
People from Garforth
People educated at Garforth Academy
Harrogate Railway Athletic F.C. managers
Ossett Town F.C. managers
Association football forwards
English footballers